Blues to the Bush is a live album by The Who recorded at the House of Blues in Chicago on 12 and 13 November 1999, and at the Empire Theatre, Shepherd's Bush on 22 and 23 December 1999. It was sold exclusively from the now defunct MusicMaker.com, though it can still be found on torrent sites and second hand markets such as EBay.

Track listing

Disc one
"I Can't Explain" – 2:37
"Substitute" – 3:16
"Anyway, Anyhow, Anywhere" (Pete Townshend, Roger Daltrey) – 4:08
"Pinball Wizard" – 2:56
"My Wife" (John Entwistle) – 7:54
"Baba O'Riley" – 5:27
"Pure and Easy" – 6:06
"You Better You Bet" – 5:39
"I'm a Boy" – 2:55
"Getting in Tune" – 5:09
"The Real Me" – 4:03

Disc two
"Behind Blue Eyes" – 3:46
"Magic Bus" – 9:19
"Boris the Spider" (John Entwistle) – 2:35
"After the Fire" – 4:49
"Who Are You" – 6:32
"5:15" – 8:35
"Won't Get Fooled Again" – 8:53
"The Kids Are Alright" – 2:16
"My Generation" – 9:20

All song written by Pete Townshend except as noted.

Personnel
The Who
Roger Daltrey - lead vocals, harmonica, acoustic guitar
John Entwistle - bass guitar, vocals
Pete Townshend - lead guitar, acoustic guitar, vocals

Additional musicians
John "Rabbit" Bundrick - piano, keyboards, backing vocals
Zak Starkey - drums

Design
 Cover design by Richard Evans
 Photography by Graham Hughes

References

External links
http://www.thewho.info/TheBluesToTheBush.htm

Self-released albums
The Who live albums
2000 live albums
Albums recorded at the House of Blues